The Grand Hotel et de Milan is a luxury hotel located in the center of Milan, Italy.

History
The construction was commissioned to architect Andrea Pizzala (1798–1862) and was inspired by the neo-Gothic movement. Inaugurated in 1863, it offered services fitting of a grand hotel of the capital of the Kingdom of Lombardy–Venetia: postal and telegramming services, as well as a hydraulic elevator. It was a short carriage ride from La Scala Theatre, renowned amongst composers, musicians, singers and music lovers who simply coined the hotel "the Milan". Near the end of the 19th century the hotel gained significant importance as it was frequented by diplomats and businessmen.
The hotel rose to prominence in 1872 when composer Giuseppe Verdi established his residence in one of the suites, which provided the privacy he needed when he was in town to work at the famous opera house La Scala.  His suite, perfectly preserved to the present day, resembled his study at his Sant'Agata home, outside Piacenza. The building was completely refurbished in 1931 and equipped with tap water and telephones in every room. In 1943, during World War II, the hotel was bombed, and the fourth floor was destroyed; in 1946, after the war, architect Giovanni Muzio was engaged to restore and renovate the building. The hotel was popular with fashion designers in the 1960s and 1970s, when Milan began hosting annual fashion weeks. In an early 1990s renovation, a defense wall dating back to the 3rd century was brought to light and featured in one of the hotel's restaurants.

Notable guests
Famous people that have stayed at the hotel include:
 Giuseppe Verdi
 Don Pedro II of Brazil
 Teresa Cristina of the Two Sicilies
 Enrico Caruso
 Fred Gaisberg
 Tamara de Lempicka
 Maria Callas
 Severino Gazzelloni
 Giorgio Jegher
 Vittorio de Sica
 Richard Burton
 Ernest Hemingway

References

External links
Official Website

Hotels in Milan
1863 establishments in Italy
Hotels established in 1863